A military outpost is detachment of troops stationed at a distance from the main force or formation, usually at a station in a remote or sparsely populated location, positioned to stand guard against unauthorized intrusions and surprise attacks; and the station occupied by such troops, usually a small military base or settlement in an outlying frontier, limit, political boundary or in another country. Outposts can also be called miniature military bases based on size and number of troops it houses.

Recent military use 
Military outposts, most recently referred to as combat outposts (COPs), served as a cornerstone of counterinsurgency doctrine in Iraq and Afghanistan.  These permanent or semi-permanent structures, often located in or near populated areas, enabled military forces to secure key lines of communication or infrastructure, secure and co-opt the populace, assist the government in restoring essential services, and force insurgents to operate elsewhere.   Combat Outposts were almost unanimously described in positive terms by defense analysts and military officers as a means through which to carry out its counterinsurgency efforts.

See also
 Border outpost
 Observation post
 Human outpost
 Military base
 Screening (tactic)

References

Borders
Military strategy
Military science
International relations theory
Military intelligence collection